The tyrant flycatchers (Tyrannidae) are a family of passerine birds which occur throughout North and South America. They are considered the largest family of birds known to exist in the world, with more than 400 species. They are the most diverse avian family in every country in the Americas, except for the United States and Canada. The members vary greatly in shape, patterns, size and colors. Some tyrant flycatchers may superficially resemble the Old World flycatchers, which they are named after but are not closely related to. They are members of suborder Tyranni (suboscines), which do not have the sophisticated vocal capabilities of most other songbirds.

A number of species previously included in this family are now placed in the family Tityridae (see Systematics). Sibley and Alquist in their 1990 bird taxonomy had the genera Mionectes, Leptopogon, Pseudotriccus, Poecilotriccus, Taenotriccus, Hemitriccus, Todirostrum and Corythopis as a separate family Pipromorphidae, but although it is still thought that these genera are basal to most of the family, they are not each other's closest relatives.

Description
Most, but not all, species are rather plain, with various hues of brown, gray and white commonplace, often providing some degree of presumed camouflage. Obvious exceptions include the bright red vermilion flycatcher, blue, black, white and yellow many-colored rush-tyrant and some species of tody-flycatchers or tyrants, which are often yellow, black, white and/or rufous, from the Todirostrum, Hemitriccus and Poecilotriccus genera. Several species have bright yellow underparts, from the ornate flycatcher to the great kiskadee. Some species have erectile crests. Several of the large genera (i.e. Elaenia, Myiarchus or Empidonax) are quite difficult to tell apart in the field due to similar plumage and some are best distinguished by their voices. Behaviorally they can vary from species such as spadebills which are tiny, shy and live in dense forest interiors to kingbirds, which are relatively large, bold, inquisitive and often inhabit open areas near human habitations. As the name implies, a great majority of tyrant flycatchers are almost entirely insectivorous (though not necessarily specialized in flies). Tyrant flycatchers are largely opportunistic feeders and often catch any flying or arboreal insect they encounter. However, food can vary greatly and some (like the large great kiskadee) will eat fruit or small vertebrates (e.g. small frogs). In North America, most species are associated with a "sallying" feeding style, where they fly up to catch an insect directly from their perch and then immediately return to the same perch. Most tropical species, however, do not feed in this fashion and several types prefer to glean insects from leaves and bark. Tropical species are sometimes found in mixed-species foraging flocks, where various types of passerines and other smallish birds are found feeding in proximity.

The smallest family members are the closely related short-tailed pygmy tyrant and black-capped pygmy tyrant from the genus Myiornis (the first species usually being considered marginally smaller on average). By length, they are the smallest passerines on earth, although some species of Old World warblers apparently rival them in their minuscule mean body masses if not in total length. The minuscule size and very short tail of the Myiornis pygmy tyrants often lend them a resemblance to a tiny ball or insect.

Habitat and distribution
Species richness of Tyrannidae, when compared to habitat, is highly variable, although most every land habitat in the Americas has at least some of these birds. The habitats of tropical lowland evergreen forest and montane evergreen forest have the highest single site species diversity while many habitats including rivers, palm forest, white sand forest, tropical deciduous forest edge, southern temperate forest, southern temperate forest edge, semi-humid/humid montane scrub, and northern temperate grassland have the lowest single species diversity. The variation between the highest and the lowest is extreme; ninety species can be found in the tropical lowland evergreen forests while the number of species that can be found in the habitats listed above typically are in the single digits. This may be due in part to the fewer niches found in certain areas and therefore fewer places for the species to occupy.

Tyrannidae specialization among habitats is very strong in tropical lowland evergreen forests and montane evergreen forests. These habitat types, therefore, display the greatest specialization. The counts differ by three species (tropical lowland evergreen forests have 49 endemic species and montane evergreen forests have 46 endemic species). It can be assumed that they both have similar levels of specialization.

Regionally, the Atlantic Forest has the highest species richness with the Chocó following closely behind.

Status and conservation
The northern beardless tyrannulet (Camptostoma imberbe) is protected under the Migratory Bird Treaty Act of 1918. This species is common south of the US border. The situation for a number of other species from South and Central America is far more problematic. In 2007, BirdLife International (and consequently IUCN) considered two species, the Minas Gerais tyrannulet and Kaempfer's tody-tyrant critically endangered. Both are endemic to Brazil. Additionally, seven species were considered endangered and eighteen species vulnerable.

Systematics
The family contains 447 species divided into 104 genera. A full list, sortable by common and binomial names, is at list of tyrant flycatcher species. Species in the genera Tityra, Pachyramphus, Laniocera and Xenopsaris were formerly placed in this family, but evidence suggested they belong in their own family, the Tityridae, where they are now placed by SACC.

See also 
List of tyrant flycatcher species

References

Further reading

External links

 Tyrant flycatcher videos, photos and sounds – Internet Bird Collection
 

Tyranni

Taxa named by Nicholas Aylward Vigors